Anisotes is a genus of Afrotropical plants in the family Acanthaceae. The genus is morphologically similar to Metarungia, from which it differs mainly in the dehiscence of the fruit capsule, and the nature of the placenta. Placentas (with attached retinacula) remain attached to the inner surface of fruit capsules in Anisotes.

They favour sandy ground or tropical to subtropical dry forest. The corolla consists of a two-lipped flower that is orange to red in colour. Four seeds are produced in a woody fruit capsule. Two of the six Madagascar species, A. hygroscopicus and A. venosus, are unique in the genus in having hygroscopic trichomes on their seeds.

Species
It includes the following species:
 Anisotes bracteatus Milne-Redh. – southern Africa
 Anisotes divaricatus T.F.Daniel, Mbola, Almeda & Phillipson – southwestern Madagascar
 Anisotes diversifolius Balf.f.
 Anisotes dumosus Milne-Redh.
 Anisotes formosissimus (Klotzsch) Milne-Redh. – Mozambique, Zimbabwe, Malawi
 Anisotes galanae (Baden) Vollesen
 Anisotes guineensis Lindau
 Anisotes hygroscopicus T.F.Daniel, 2013 – Madagascar
 Anisotes involucratus Fiori
 Anisotes longistrobus (C.B.Clarke) Vollesen
 Anisotes macrophyllus (Lindau) Heine
 Anisotes madagascariensis Benoist – southwestern Madagascar
 Anisotes nyassae Baden
 Anisotes parvifolius Oliv.
 Anisotes perplexus  T.F.Daniel, 2013 – Madagascar
 Anisotes rogersii S.Moore – southern Africa
 Anisotes sessiliflorus (T.Anderson) C.B.Clarke
 Anisotes spectabilis (Mildbr.) Vollesen
 Anisotes subcoriaceus T.F.Daniel, 2013 – Madagascar
 Anisotes tangensis Baden
 Anisotes trisulcus (Forssk.) Nees	
 Anisotes ukambensis Lindau	
 Anisotes umbrosus Milne-Redh.
 Anisotes venosus T.F.Daniel, 2013 – Madagascar
 Anisotes zenkeri (Lindau) C.B.Clarke

References

Acanthaceae
Flora of Africa
Taxonomy articles created by Polbot